Charles Pray may refer to:

 Charles Nelson Pray (1868–1963), Montana politician
 Charles P. Pray (born 1945), Maine politician